Eucosma hohenwartiana, the bright bell, is a species of moth of the family Tortricidae. It is found in China (Heilongjiang, jiangxi), Central Asia, North Africa and Europe, where it has been recorded from Sardinia, Sicily, Ireland, Great Britain, Spain, France, Germany, the Benelux, Denmark, Austria, Switzerland, Italy, the Czech Republic, Slovakia, Slovenia, Hungary, Poland, Romania, Bosnia and Herzegovina, Norway, Sweden, Finland, the Baltic region and Russia. The habitat consists of dry open areas and grassland.

The wingspan is 15–22 mm. Adults are highly variable in both size and wing pattern. The forewings are usually dark brown with contrasting markings. It is very similar to 
Eucosma cana

The larvae feed on Centaurea cyanus, Centaurea scabiosa, Centaurea jacea, Serratula tinctoria, Carduus, Cirsium and Picris species. They feed on the flowers and developing seeds of their host plant. The larvae have a pinkish-ochreous to pink body and a pale to mid-brown head. The species overwinters in the larval stage amongst detritus on the ground.

References

Eucosmini
Moths described in 1775
Moths of Africa
Moths of Asia
Tortricidae of Europe
Taxa named by Michael Denis
Taxa named by Ignaz Schiffermüller